Z is the 26th and last letter of the Latin alphabet.

Z may also refer to:

Film and television
 Z (1969 film), a 1969 Algerian-French thriller film based on the murder of a Greek politician.
 Z (1999 film), a 1999 Kannada mystery-thriller film
 Z (2019 film), a 2019 Canadian horror film
 Z movie, a description for low-budget films
 The Lost City of Z (film), 2017 biopic about explorer Percy Fawcett
 Project Z (film), Telugu language version of the science fiction thriller Maayavan
 Z-Cars, a British police procedural TV drama series
 Z: The Beginning of Everything, television series about the life of Zelda Fitzgerald
 Elizabeth "Z" Delgado, a Power Rangers: S.P.D. character
 Z, the production code for the 1966 Doctor Who serial The Gunfighters
 Z-4195, often called "Z", a worker ant, the protagonist of Antz
 Ultraman Z, a 2020 tokusatsu series
 World War Z (film), a 2013 zombie horror film

Music
 Z (Aion album)
 Z (EP)
 Z (My Morning Jacket album)
 Z number, prefix for works of Henry Purcell in the Zimmerman catalog
 Project Z (band), band for which Jimmy Herring played
 WHTZ, or Z 100, an iHeartRadio station in New York City
 "Z", a song by Gayle that was released in 2020

Literature
 "Z", a pseudonym of Ezra Pound
 Z: A Novel of Zelda Fitzgerald, by Therese Fowler
 Z, a novel by Vassilis Vassilikos
 Z, a play by Anne Szumigalski

Mathematics
 Z-score, a concept in statistics
 zepto- (z), an SI prefix meaning 10−21
 zetta- (Z), an SI prefix meaning 1021
 , the set of integer numbers
 , the set of all integers modulo .
 , the set of all -adic integers or sometimes the set of all integers modulo .
 Z, symbol for plastic section modulus, a geometric property
 Z, the number 35  in base 36 and higher
 z-axis, part of the Cartesian coordinate system

Computing
 .Z, a file extension
 Z (video game), a 1996 computer game
 Z notation, a specification language for computing systems
 z-buffering, the management of depth for 3-D graphics
 Z-machine, a virtual machine used by Infocom for text adventure games
 z/OS, a 64 bit operating system for mainframe computers
 Z or ZF or Z flag, designations for the zero flag register
 HP Z, a PC workstation brand of Hewlett Packard

Natural sciences
 Z boson, an elementary particle
 Z, symbol for Atomic number (the number of protons in an atom's nucleus)
 Z, symbol for Compressibility factor (a thermodynamic property)
 Z, symbol for metallicity (the mass proportion of an astronomical object that is neither hydrogen nor helium)
 Z, abbreviation for Carboxybenzyl (an organic compound)
 , the degree of redshift in astronomical spectroscopy
 Z, a descriptor for stereoisomers with a double bond in E-Z notation
 Z, the number of formula units per unit cell in a crystalline solid
 Z Pulsed Power Facility, an X-ray generator
 Z chromosome
 Haplogroup Z

Transportation
 Z (New York City Subway service)
 Honda Z, a kei car
 Honda Z series, a line of minibikes
 Nissan Z-car, a series of sports cars
 Kawasaki Z series, a series of motorcycles

Military
 Zulu, the military time zone code for UTC
 Z (military symbol), a symbol used by Russian military vehicles during the 2022 Russian invasion of Ukraine
 Operation Z, the Japanese code name for the 1941 attack on Pearl Harbor in its planning stages
 Operation Z (1944), the initial Japanese plan for the defense of the Marianas Islands in WWII
 Force Z, the British naval squadron sunk off Malaya in 1941
 Plan Z, a German naval construction program
 Class Z Reserve, contingent of the British Army
 Project Z (bomber project) of World War II Japan
 Z-4 Plan, a proposal to settle the Croatian War of Independence

Organisations
 Together (Zajedno), a political party in Serbia
 Z Energy, a New Zealand energy processing company
 Z Corporation, a computer printer company
 Z Communications, an activist media group, publishers of Z Magazine
 Z, a brand logo of Zed Books (a publishing company in London)
 Z, stock trading symbol for the Zillow Group

Other uses
 Z flag, one of the international maritime signal flags
 Z-plan castle, a form of castle design common in England and Scotland
 Z (cartoonist)
 Z (joke line), an American dial-a-joke service of the 1970s and 1980s
 Z scale, a 1:220 model railway scale
 , the IPA symbol for a voiced alveolar sibilant sound
 Lost City of Z, a hypothetical ancient city in Brazil
 Z (underaged killer), placeholder designation of an unnamed 15-year-old minor who committed the 2001 murder of Annie Leong under the orders of her husband Anthony Ler in Singapore

See also

 
 Wolfsangel, a Z-shaped symbol
 Ž, Ż, Ź, Ze (Cyrillic), Ezh and Ro (kana)
 Z with stroke, Ƶ character 
 Big Z (disambiguation)
 Channel Z (disambiguation)
 Z Channel (disambiguation)
 Z Force (disambiguation)
 Z Plan (disambiguation)
 Zed (disambiguation)
 Zee (disambiguation)
 ZZ (disambiguation)
 Zzz (disambiguation)
 Zzzz (disambiguation)